The Premier Volleyball League 1st Season Reinforced Open Conference was the first conference of the Premier Volleyball League (28th conference of the former Shakey's V-League). Conference started on April 30, 2017 and concluded on June 13, 2017. All elimination round games were played at the FilOil Flying V Centre in San Juan while the semifinals and Finals games were held at the PhilSports Arena in Pasig.

The women's tournament was supposed to feature the use of foreign reinforcements, however, they were initially unable to play due to difficulty in securing their international transfer certificates (ITC) from the FIVB. On May 17, 2017, Larong Volleyball sa Pilipinas, Inc. (LVPI) confirmed that the FIVB has approved the ITC requests for the imports. The imports began to play on May 18, 2017.

Women's division

Participating Teams

Foreign players

Format

Preliminaries
Double round robin preliminary
Top two teams (ranks 1 and 2) after the preliminary round will automatically enter the semifinals round.

Quarterfinals
The bottom four teams after the preliminary round will play a single round robin to determine the two teams (as ranks 3 and 4) that will advance to the semifinals round.

Semifinals
Teams will compete in a best-of-three series as follows: Rank 1 vs Rank 4 and Rank 2 vs Rank 3.

Finals
Best-of-three series for the Final and Bronze matches.

Preliminary round

Match results
All times are in Philippines Standard Time (UTC+08:00)

Quarterfinals

Match results

Semifinals

 All series are best-of-3

Rank 1 vs Rank 4

Rank 2 vs Rank 3

Finals

3rd Place

Championship

Men's division

Participating Teams

Format

Preliminaries
Single round robin preliminary

Semifinals
Top four teams after the preliminary round will enter the semifinals round.
Teams will compete in a best-of-three series as follows: Rank 1 vs Rank 4 and Rank 2 vs Rank 3.

Finals
Best-of-three series for the Final and Bronze matches.

Preliminary round

Match results
All times are in Philippines Standard Time (UTC+08:00)

Fourth-seed playoff

 Philippine Army Troopers advances to the semifinals round.

Semifinals
 Ranking is based from the preliminary round.

 All series are best-of-3

Rank 1 vs Rank 4

Rank 2 vs Rank 3

Finals

3rd Place

Championship

Awards

Final standings

References

2017 in Philippine sport
Premier Volleyball League (Philippines) 2017 Season